The Alabama–Auburn football rivalry, better known as the Iron Bowl, is an American college football rivalry game between the Auburn University Tigers and University of Alabama Crimson Tide, both charter members of the Southeastern Conference (SEC) and both teams located in the state of Alabama. The series is considered one of the most important football rivalries in American sports. The rivalry, which started in 1893, was played for many years at Legion Field in Birmingham, Alabama. In the early 20th Century, Birmingham was the leading industrial city of the South, rivaling Pittsburgh in the production of pig iron, coke, coal and the manufacture of steel. Thus, the term "Iron Bowl" came to represent the rivalry.  Auburn Coach Ralph "Shug" Jordan is credited with actually coining it—when asked by reporters in 1964 how he would deal with the disappointment of not taking his team to a bowl game, he responded, "We've got our bowl game. We have it every year. It's the Iron Bowl in Birmingham."

Alabama has a winning record against every Southeastern Conference team and leads the series with Auburn 49–37–1. The game was traditionally played on Thanksgiving weekend, but in 1993, the schools agreed to move the game up to the week before Thanksgiving to give themselves a bye for a potential SEC Championship Game berth. In 2007 the conference voted to disallow any team from having a bye before the league championship game, returning the game to its traditional Thanksgiving weekend spot.

The rivalry has long been one of the most heated collegiate rivalries in the country. It is all the more heated because the two schools have been among the nation's elite teams for most of the time since the 1950s. Together, they account for 36 SEC titles, 28 by Alabama and eight by Auburn. Both are among the most successful programs in major college football history; Alabama is second in all-time total wins among Division I FBS schools while Auburn is 13th. The two schools have been fixtures on national television since the late 1970s; the only time since then that the season-ending clash has not been nationally televised was in 1993, when Auburn was barred from live TV due to NCAA sanctions.

For much of the 20th century, the game was played every year in Birmingham, with Alabama winning 34 games and Auburn 19. Four games were played in Montgomery, Alabama, with each team winning two. Since 1999, the games have been played at Jordan–Hare Stadium in Auburn every odd-numbered year and at Bryant–Denny Stadium in Tuscaloosa every even-numbered year.

History

The contest became the extension of a bitter political debate which took place in the Alabama State Legislature regarding the location of the new land-grant college under the state's application under the Morrill Land Grant Act of 1862 during the Civil War Reconstruction Era. The state legislature, influenced by a heavy contingent of representatives who were University of Alabama alumni, pushed to sell the land scripts of 240,000 acres acquired from the Morrill Act or have any new land holdings held in conjunction with the University of Alabama in Tuscaloosa. The debate lasted over four years, until Lee County and the City of Auburn won the location of the new university in 1872, after donating more than a hundred acres and the remaining buildings and property of the East Alabama Male College. At the time of the Auburn decision the state legislature and governorship was controlled by Radical Republicans such as "Scalawag" Southern Republicans and Freedman African-Americans. By 1874, former Confederate and "Redeemer" forces from the Democratic Party gradually overturned the Radicals' control of the Alabama state legislature. The Democrats then attempted to overturn most legislation passed during the Reconstruction Period, including the founding of the new land-grant college at Auburn.

During the 1870s, Auburn (then named the Agricultural and Mechanical College of Alabama) which received no appropriated funds from the state, was on the edge of financial collapse. Collapse of Auburn meant that the University of Alabama could assume the remaining land scripts, thus profiting from the closure of the new land-grant college. The University of Alabama remained closed till 1871 following the Civil War, during which it was partially destroyed by Union forces.. "By 1877, competition between the University of Alabama and the Agricultural & Mechanical College for patronage had intensified. In January, Auburn President Isaac Tichenor reported to the board of trustees that Alabama had reduced its tuition and lowered its graduation standards. Tichenor responded by requesting that the board drop tuition and create a boarding department to further lower expenses." The University of Alabama had developed a reciprocal interest in the Alabama Coal Operators Association along with their “Big Mule” allies with vast timber holdings across the Black Belt of Alabama.

Alabama and Auburn played their first football game in Lakeview Park in Birmingham, Alabama, on February 22, 1893. Auburn won 32–22, before an estimated crowd of 5,000. Alabama considered the game to be the final matchup of the 1892 season while Auburn recorded it as the first matchup of 1893.

In 1902, a bill was introduced into both houses of the U.S. Congress to fund the creation of a "School of Mines and Mining Engineering" at each land-grant college. Under the provision of the bill, each participating land-grant college would receive $5,000 annually with $500 each additional year for 10 years. The University of Alabama secretly sent Professor Dr. Eugene Smith to lobby against passage of the bill or to amend the bill to allow other universities to participate in the federal program. Auburn responded by sending Professor C.C. Thach to D.C. to lobby with the Association of Land-Grant Colleges for a compromise to allow passage of the bill. The bill would later fail to receive passage.

During the 1907 state legislature session, a debate surfaced to move the land-grant college from Auburn to Birmingham. 

One constant during the rivalry hiatus was Auburn’s Coach Mike Donahue.  Donahue became a fixture at Auburn, coaching football from 1904 to 1922 along with basketball from 1905 to 1921 while also ascending to the position of Athletic Director.  The first basketball game between Auburn and Alabama was by chance occurring in 1924 in the Southern Conference Tournament. This would be the only basketball matchup till 1941 which again was by chance in another conference tournament. 

During the 1930s and into the 1940s while the football rivalry was in hiatus, Auburn under the leadership of President Duncan, became the administrative home for several New Deal agencies: the Agricultural Adjustment Administration, the Soil Conservation Service, and the Resettlement Administration. The federal Government funding flowing into Auburn soon drew the ire of the University of Alabama trustees and their partisans in the Alabama Legislature. President Duncan was able to influence the placement of these agencies at Auburn due to his support for Governor Bibb Graves. 
Both the president and the governor supported the New Deal faction of the Democratic Party in Alabama. Graves was well connected in Washington D.C. with President Franklin D. Roosevelt and often lobbied in D.C. on "plum-tree-shaking expeditions". Meanwhile, Duncan with his connections in the Alabama Farm Bureau and as the director of the Extension Service exercised great control over the organized farm vote. By the mid 1940s, the Democratic Party was splintering in Alabama, with the rise of the Dixiecrats and those who remained loyal to the national party. One of the most outspoken critics of Auburn was publisher Harry Ayers, who would later endorse Harry Truman in 1945. In 1940 Duncan had successfully opposed Ayers' candidacy as a delegate to the Democratic National Convention, which deeply offended the publisher. The Anniston editor had been a long-time advocate of consolidating Auburn and Alabama, "so that Auburn would become the dangling tail of a Tuscaloosa kite". In August, 1942, President Duncan wrote to Raymond Paty, the newly appointed president of the University of Alabama, that the relationship between their two schools was "of such magnitude and gravity" that he had given the question more attention than any other problem he faced as president. He urged Paty that Auburn and Alabama should agree upon a funding formula that would give each institution the same appropriation per in-state student, an idea which worked against the University of Alabama's self-image as the state's capstone university.

During a 1945 legislative session, the University of Alabama's report to the commission (Alabama Educational Survey Commission) argued that the Tuscaloosa school had well-established and broad responsibilities for higher education in the state. Four times in Alabama history, higher education responsibilities had been delegated to other institutions. In three of the four cases, this occurred under a state government established during the Reconstruction period: creation of the normal schools, higher education for blacks, and establishment of the land-grant college at Auburn. The fourth case was the state women's college at Montevallo. In each case, this was argued to have resulted from "the illogic inherent in the evolution of a democratic government". The Alabama report drew a sharp response from then Auburn President Luther Duncan, who said that he had never seen "a bolder, more deliberate, more vicious, or more deceptive document". He predicted that if the friends of Auburn and Montevallo did not rise up to combat "this evil monster", it would consume them "just like the doctrine of Hitler". Duncan also remarked that according to Alabama, "Auburn is the illegitimate children... born out of the misery of the Reconstruction period."

By 1945, with the end of World War II, the GI Bill had inundated Auburn (then officially named the Alabama Polytechnic Institute), with students—doubling enrollment twice between 1944 and 1948. With the increased enrollment, it was now obvious that Auburn would never "become so weak that... it could be absorbed" by the University of Alabama.

In March 1947, the Auburn Board of Trustees, with Governor Jim Folsom in attendance, unanimously approved the following resolution, "Whereas, The Alabama Polytechnic Institute and the University of Alabama are important educational institutions of the State of Alabama and are maintained and operated by the people of the State; and Whereas, many years ago athletic relationship between the Alabama Polytechnic Institute and the University of Alabama was discontinued; and Whereas, intercollegiate rivalry between the two institutions would be conducive to a better understanding among students of both schools and would tend to promote interest in athletic engagements in Alabama, therefore Be It Resolved by the Board of Trustees of Alabama Polytechnic Institute in meeting assembled, that the President of the Alabama Polytechnic Institute, through its Athletic Director, make necessary negotiation with the Director of Athletics of the University of Alabama to resume athletic competition between the two institutions at the earliest possible date, and that a copy of this resolution be furnished to the President and Athletic Director of the University of Alabama." The Governor then suggested that the game be played not later than the first Saturday in December 1947.
Also during 1947, the Alabama House of Representatives passed a resolution encouraging both universities to "make possible the inauguration of a full athletic program between the two schools". But the resolution did not have the effect of law, the schools still could not agree, the Legislature threatened to withhold state funding. In April 1948, Alabama president John Gallalee and Auburn president Ralph B. Draughon met and agreed to renew the series in 1948 and for the following 1949 season.

It was agreed that the games would be played as a neutral site series in Birmingham. Legion Field held 47,000 fans in 1948, dwarfing both Tuscaloosa's Denny Stadium (31,000) and Auburn Stadium (15,000; expanded to 21,500 and renamed Cliff Hare Stadium in 1949). Also it is believed Alabama refused to travel to Auburn, citing poor roads and the small size of Hare Stadium. Alabama was joined in this sentiment by the Tennessee Volunteers (who refused to play in Auburn until 1974) and Georgia Tech Yellow Jackets (who did not travel to Auburn from 1900 to 1970). Auburn played its last home game at Legion Field, outside of the Iron Bowl, in 1978 against Tennessee.

Between 1969 and 1987, Auburn made additions to Jordan–Hare Stadium until it eclipsed Legion Field in size. Auburn was in the process of expanding Jordan-Hare Stadium from 72,169 seats to 85,214 for the 1987 season, almost 10,000 more than Legion Field. had a capacity of 75,808. (Alabama's Bryant-Denny Stadium then seated a little over 60,000, but expanded to 70,123 in 1988.) By this time, Auburn fans began feeling chagrin at playing all Iron Bowl games at Legion Field. Despite the equal allotment of tickets, Auburn fans insisted that Legion Field was not a neutral site. This, despite the fact that Auburn played many of their most important rivalry games in Birmingham for most of the 20th century (among those were Georgia Tech and Tennessee). Auburn's perceived feeling of chagrin was more a business decision than a real reason of Legion Field not truly being neutral. While was Legion Field just 45 minutes east of Tuscaloosa, the stadium had long been associated with Alabama football in Auburn's eyes. Well into the 1980s, Alabama played most of its important games in Birmingham—most of Alabama's "home" football history from the 1920s to the 1980s actually took place at Legion Field. For this reason, Auburn began lobbying to make the Iron Bowl a "home-and-home" series. When Pat Dye became Auburn's head football coach and athletics director in 1981, he met with his longtime mentor, Alabama head coach and athletic director Paul "Bear" Bryant. Dye recalled that at that meeting, "the first thing he said to me, very first thing, he said, 'Well, I guess you're going to want to take that game to Auburn.'" Dye confirmed that hunch, saying, "We're going to take it to Auburn." When Bryant noted that the schools' contract with Legion Field ran through 1988, Dye replied, "Well, we'll play 89 in Auburn." Although Auburn would have possibly been within its rights to move its home games to Jordan-Hare before then, Dye knew that Bryant was adamantly opposed to playing any Iron Bowl games in Auburn. He knew Bryant's standing in the state was such that it would be folly to attempt making the Iron Bowl a home-and-home series as long as Bryant was still alive.

In the late 80s, the schools agreed that Auburn could play their home games for the Iron Bowl at Jordan-Hare starting in 1989 (with the exception of 1991) and Alabama would continue to play its "home" games at Legion Field. On December 2, 1989, Alabama came to "the Plains" for the first time ever as a sellout crowd witnessed Auburn win its first true "home" game of the series, 30–20 over an Alabama team that entered the game undefeated and ranked No.2 in the country.

Alabama continued to hold its home games for the rivalry at Legion Field. In 1998, Alabama expanded Bryant–Denny Stadium to a capacity of 83,818, narrowly eclipsing Legion Field. Alabama moved their home games in the series to Bryant–Denny Stadium in 2000. That year, Auburn came to Tuscaloosa for the first time since 1901 and won in a defensive struggle, 9–0. A new attendance record for the Iron Bowl was set in 2006 as the latest expansion to Bryant–Denny Stadium increased its capacity to 92,138. The record was reset again in 2010, after another expansion to Alabama's Bryant–Denny Stadium, when a crowd of 101,821 witnessed a 28–27 Auburn victory.

Broadcasters

In 2009 and 2010 CBS Sports and the two universities arranged to have the game played in an exclusive time slot on the Friday following Thanksgiving. The 2009 game was the sixth Iron Bowl to be played on a Friday and the first one in 21 years. CBS did not attempt to renew the agreement after 2010 due to criticism from both fan bases, returning the game to its traditional Saturday date. Although CBS has broadcast the majority of Iron Bowl games since 1996 through its SEC coverage, ESPN has aired the game several times, from 1995 through 1999, 2003, and 2007. In 2014, CBS's decision to broadcast the Egg Bowl due to a number of factors (which included contractual limits on how many times CBS may feature certain teams, and the larger prominence of the Egg Bowl due to its potential effects on Mississippi State's participation in the College Football Playoff) resulted in ESPN broadcasting the first Iron Bowl played in primetime since 2007.

Foy–ODK Trophy

The Foy–ODK Trophy is named after James E. Foy, a former dean of student affairs at both schools, and Omicron Delta Kappa, an honor society on both campuses since the 1920s.  In 1948 Omicron Delta Kappa fraternity sponsored the purchase of the trophy. The trophy is presented at halftime of the Alabama–Auburn basketball game later in the same academic year at the winner's home court, where the SGA President of the losing football team traditionally sings the winning team's fight song.

Notable games

February 22, 1893: This was the first meeting between Auburn and Alabama. Auburn beat Alabama in Birmingham 32–22.

1904: On November 12, Auburn coach Mike Donahue defeated Alabama in his first season, the purpose for his hiring.

1906: Alabama's star running back Auxford Burks scored all the game's points in a 10–0 victory. Auburn contended that Alabama player T. S. Sims was an illegal player, but the Southern Intercollegiate Athletic Association (SIAA) denied the claim. Alabama coach Doc Pollard used a "military shift" never before seen in the south to gain an advantage over Auburn.

1948: The rivalry resumed after being suspended for 41 years due to issues related to player per diems and officiating. Alabama beat Auburn 55–0 at Legion Field, which remains the largest margin of victory in series history.

1964: In the first Iron Bowl broadcast on national television, quarterback Joe Namath led Alabama to a 21–14 victory over Auburn.

1967: This was the first night game in the series. Thunderstorms soaked Legion Field, making the field extremely muddy. The game was frequently stopped to clear raincoats and other wet weather gear from the field. Late in the game, Alabama quarterback Ken Stabler ran 47 yards for a touchdown to give Alabama a 7–3 victory. This run became known in Crimson Tide lore as the "run in the mud".

1971: Both teams entered the game undefeated and untied for the first time in the series. No. 3 Alabama defeated No. 5 Auburn 31–7 at Legion Field.

1972: Down 16–3 late in the game, Auburn blocked two punts and returned both for touchdowns, leading to an improbable 17–16 Auburn win and the coining of a new phrase among Auburn fans, "Punt Bama Punt!" In August 2010, ESPN.com ranked this game the 8th most painful outcome in college football history. Alabama would go on to win the next 9 games in a row (1973-1981), known to Auburn fans as the "Reign of Terror".

1981: Coach Bear Bryant earned his 315th career win after Alabama defeated Auburn 28–17. With the victory, Bryant passed Amos Alonzo Stagg to become the all-time winningest FBS coach at the time. This was the final game in Alabama's nine-game winning streak over Auburn, the longest streak in Iron Bowl history.

1982: Auburn won 23–22, driving the length of the field in the final two minutes with freshman running back Bo Jackson scoring the winning touchdown on the memorable play called "Bo Over the Top". This was Auburn's first Iron Bowl win in ten years and the last to be coached by Bear Bryant, who retired after the season and died exactly 60 days after this game.

1984: Trailing 17–15 late in the game, Auburn had 4th-and-goal from the one-yard line. Opting to go for it, Auburn called a pitch to running back Brent Fullwood. Running back Bo Jackson, who was supposed to block for Fullwood, ran the wrong direction, allowing the Alabama defense to easily push Fullwood out of bounds short of the goal line to seal the victory.

1985: "The KICK" Alabama beat Auburn 25–23 on a 52-yard field goal by Van Tiffin as time expired. A close game was elevated by the "epic" fourth quarter "with the teams trading haymakers and the lead changing hands four times." Alabama drove from their own 20-yard-line in the final minute, including a fourth-down flanker reverse to keep the drive alive. As recently as 2015, longtime sports reporter Paul Finebaum remarked, "It’s still the greatest football game I’ve ever seen."

1989 No. 11 Auburn hosted No. 2 Alabama in the first Iron Bowl game played on Auburn's home field. Auburn won 30–20, ending Alabama's national title hopes, and gave Auburn a share of their third straight conference championship. Alabama coach Bill Curry was tendered a contract after the season that contained no raise and removed his authority to hire and fire assistants, leading to his eventual resignation.

1993: No. 6 Auburn defeated No. 11 Alabama 22–14 to finish the season undefeated at 11–0. The game, at Jordan Hare Stadium, was not televised due to Auburn's probation but was shown on closed-circuit television before 47,421 fans at Bryant–Denny Stadium.

1994: Both teams entered the game undefeated for the first time since 1971. No. 4 Alabama defeated No. 6 Auburn 21–14 to win the SEC West.

1997: "The Fumble" (Auburn 18, Alabama 17) - Alabama fullback Ed Scissum fumbled on a screen pass that was meant to give the underdog Crimson Tide a game-sealing first down. Auburn kicker Jaret Holmes converted a go-ahead 39-yard field goal, and Alabama's last-chance attempt from 57 yards fell well short to give Auburn the SEC Western Division title.  Auburn radio announcer Jim Fyffe is remembered by his dramatic call of the game winning field goal "long enough, high enough, It's good! it's good! it's good! it's good! it's good! it's good!" 

2000: In the first Iron Bowl played in Bryant–Denny Stadium and the first played in Tuscaloosa since 1901, Auburn kicked three field goals to beat Alabama 9–0. This would be Mike Dubose's final game as Alabama head coach. It is also to date the last time Alabama has been shut out in any game.

2005: No. 11 Auburn defeated No. 8 Alabama 28–18 at Jordan-Hare, recording 11 sacks on Alabama quarterback Brodie Croyle, in what came to be known as "The Sack Game" among Auburn fans.

2007: No. 25 Auburn defeated unranked Alabama 17–10 at Jordan-Hare in the first Iron Bowl for Alabama Coach Nick Saban.  The victory marked the sixth in a row for Auburn in the series and cut Alabama's all-time series lead over the Tigers to five games, the closest margin since 1974.

2008; No. 1 Alabama defeated unranked Auburn 36–0 at Bryant-Denny Stadium in the last game at Auburn for Coach Tommy Tuberville.  The victory was the first ever for Alabama over Auburn in Tuscaloosa and snapped a six-game Auburn series winning streak.

2009: With Auburn leading 21–20 at home in the fourth quarter, the Crimson Tide engineered a 15-play, 79-yard drive that would last over seven minutes of game time.  During the drive, Alabama quarterback Greg McElroy completed six consecutive passes, four to wide receiver Julio Jones covering 59 yards.  At the Auburn 4-yard line with 1:24 left in the game, McElroy found fullback Roy Upchurch open in the right flat for the winning touchdown. Alabama, led by Heisman Award-winning running back Mark Ingram, won 26–21 and would go on to win the SEC and National Championship to complete a 14–0 undefeated season.

2010: No. 2 Auburn defeated No. 11 Alabama 28–27 in Tuscaloosa after erasing a 24–0 deficit — the largest comeback win in series history — led by Auburn's Heisman winning quarterback, Cam Newton. "The Camback" preserved Auburn's undefeated season, which eventually resulted in Auburn's second national championship. This is arguably the most contentious meeting in the rivalry's history, with Auburn fans decorating Bear Bryant’s statue with a Cam Newton jersey, and an Alabama fan poisoning the famous oak trees at Toomer’s Corner.

2013: No. 4 Auburn defeated No. 1 Alabama 34–28.  With one second remaining and the game tied 28–28, Alabama's freshman kicker Adam Griffith attempted a 57-yard potential game-winning field goal. The kick fell short, and Auburn cornerback Chris Davis caught the ball at the back of the endzone and returned it 109 yards for the game-winning touchdown as time expired in what became known as the "Kick Six" game. The 2013 Iron Bowl won the ESPY Award for "Best Game" of the year in any sport, and the final play by Davis won the ESPY Award for "Best Play" of the year.

2014: No. 1 Alabama defeated No. 15 Auburn 55–44, the highest scoring Iron Bowl ever.

2017: No. 6 Auburn defeated No. 1 Alabama, 26–14, their largest margin of victory over Alabama since 1969.  Despite not winning the SEC Championship or even the Western Division title, the loss did not prevent Alabama from winning the 2017 national championship. Auburn went on to lose to Georgia in the SEC Championship game in Atlanta.

2018: No. 1 Alabama defeated unranked Auburn 52–21, led by sophomore quarterback Tua Tagovailoa, who passed for 5 touchdowns and ran for one more.  It would be the first time that an Alabama player would account for six touchdowns in a single game.

2019: No. 15 Auburn defeated No. 5 Alabama, 48–45, in a classic back-and-forth match. After losing starting quarterback Tua Tagovailoa to injury a few weeks earlier, sophomore Mac Jones would be asked to step in against the Tigers. Auburn intercepted Jones twice, returning both for touchdowns.  Alabama missed a game-tying field goal late in the fourth quarter, but forced an Auburn fourth down on the next possession with just 1:04 remaining on the clock.  Auburn lined up in a formation with the punter out wide which confused the defense and led to an Alabama penalty for having too many players on the field. The five-yard penalty gave Auburn a first down and allowed the Tigers to run out the clock. With the loss, Alabama was knocked out of playoff contention for the first time since the creation of the four-team format in 2014. This loss also marked the first time Alabama had two or more regular-season losses since 2010.

2021: No. 3 Alabama defeated unranked Auburn 24–22 in a four-overtime game.  Auburn starting quarterback Bo Nix did not play due to an ankle injury. After allowing seven sacks and committing eleven penalties, Alabama trailed 10–3 with 1:43 remaining. The Tide, led by quarterback Bryce Young, drove 97 yards for a game-tying touchdown to force the first overtime game in Iron Bowl history. (Although the rivalry game had been played 86 times, dating back to 1893, overtime in college football was instituted beginning with bowl games after the 1995 season.)

Game results

Since 1893, the Crimson Tide and Tigers have played 87 times. Alabama leads the series 49–37–1. The game has been played in four cities: Auburn, Birmingham, Montgomery, and Tuscaloosa. Alabama leads the series in Birmingham (34–18–1). Auburn leads the series in Auburn (10–6). The series is tied in Montgomery (2–2) and Tuscaloosa (7–7). Alabama leads the series since it was resumed in the modern era in 1948 (45–30). For the first time in the series history, five consecutive Iron Bowl winners went to the BCS National Championship Game: Alabama in 2009, Auburn in 2010, and Alabama again in 2011 and 2012. Auburn also went in 2013, but lost to Florida State. Alabama's 2009 BCS National Championship followed by Auburn's 2010 BCS National Championship marks the first time that two different teams from the same state won consecutive BCS National Championships. One of the teams from this rivalry has gone to the BCS or CFP 12 times in 13 years from 2009 to 2021, with Alabama going 10 times (2009, 2011, 2012, 2014, 2015, 2016, 2017, 2018, 2020, 2021) and winning 6 (2009, 2011, 2012, 2015, 2017, 2020) and Auburn going twice (2010, 2013) and winning once (2010).

See also

 List of NCAA college football rivalry games
 Alabama–Auburn men's basketball rivalry

References

Informational notes

Citations

Bibliography
 Anderson, Lars, "Alabama: State Of The Rivalry—Auburn's national title stirred no Crimson pride in neighboring Tuscaloosa", Sports Illustrated (January 24, 2011).
 Groom, Winston. The Crimson Tide—An Illustrated History. Tuscaloosa: The University of Alabama Press, 2000. .

External links
 Iron Bowl article in the Encyclopedia of Alabama
 Iron Bowl History: Thrilling Moments
 The Iron Bowl

 
College football rivalries in the United States